Oswego Public Library is a library in Oswego, Kansas

Oswego Public Library may also refer to:
Oswego City Library, a historic place in Oswego County, New York
Oswego Public Library, a library in Oswego, Illinois